The Goddess of Rio Beni (German: Die Göttin vom Rio Beni, Brazilian: Mundo Estranho) is a 1950 West German-Brazilian adventure film directed by Franz Eichhorn and starring Angelika Hauff, Helmuth Schneider and America Cabral.

Cast
 Angelika Hauff as Elisa 
 Helmuth Schneider as Edgar 
 America Cabral as Father 
 Carmen Brown as Dancer 
 Kumatzaikuma as Indian Chief 
 Ary Jartul as Ary 
 Grijo Sobrinho as Innkeeper 
 Walter Hardt as Publisher
 Antonio Cursati
 Hermann Geiger-Torel as Caranza 
 Nicolai Jartulary
 Jaime Marini
 Lalo Maura
 Juan Pecci
 Linda Rodrigues
 Jesus Ruas
 José Ruzzo
 Amalia Sánchez Ariño
 Bogusław Samborski

See also
Golden Goddess of Rio Beni (1964)

References

Bibliography
 David Kerekes & David Slater. Killing for Culture. Creation Books, 1995.

External links
 

1950 films
West German films
1950 adventure films
German adventure films
Brazilian adventure films
1950s German-language films
Films directed by Franz Eichhorn
Constantin Film films
Brazilian black-and-white films
German black-and-white films
1950s German films